Machlolophus is a genus of birds in the tit family. The species were formerly placed with many others in the genus Parus but were moved to Machlolophus based on a molecular phylogenetic analysis published in 2013 that showed that the members formed a distinct clade.

The name Machlolophus was introduced by the German ornithologist Jean Cabanis in 1850. The word is derived from the classical Greek makhlos meaning luxuriant and lophos meaning crest.

The following species, all from Asia, have been placed in the genus:

References

 
Bird genera